This is a list of proprietary laboratory information management systems (LIMS) from businesses and organizations which have articles about them in Wikipedia.

 Accelrys LIMS from Accelrys
 BaseSpace Clarity LIMS from Illumina
 BIOVIA LIMS from Dassault Systèmes
 CCLAS from ABB Group
 ELab from LabLynx
 Hach WIMS from Hach Company
 LABbase from Analytik Jena
 LabWare LIMS from LabWare, Inc.
 Labvantage from LabVantage
 Nautilus LIMS from Thermo Fisher Scientific
 NuGenesis 8 from Waters Corporation
 OmicsHub from Integromics
 readyLIMS from Analytik Jena
 SampleManager LIMS from Thermo Fisher Scientific
 SampleTrack from Bruker
 SIMATIC IT R&D Suite from Siemens
 SLIMS from Agilent Technologies
 STARLIMS from Abbott Laboratories
 TrakCare Lab Enterprise from InterSystems
 Watson LIMS from Thermo Fisher Scientific
 webLIMS from LabLynx

See also
Magazines and journals covering LIMS
 Scientific Computing & Instrumentation

LIMS Packages